Iryna Butar (born 26 February 1980) is a Belarusian heptathlete.

Achievements

External links

1980 births
Living people
Belarusian heptathletes